Australia competed at the 2019 World Aquatics Championships in Gwangju, South Korea from 12 to 28 July.

Medalists

Artistic swimming

Australia's artistic swimming team consisted of 14 athletes (13 female and 1 male).

Women

Mixed

 Legend: (R) = Reserve Athlete

Diving

Australia entered 13 divers.

Men

Women

Mixed

High diving

Australia qualified two female high divers.

Open water swimming

Australia qualified four male and four female open water swimmers.

Men

Women

Mixed

Swimming

Australia entered 27 swimmers.

Men

Women

Mixed

 Legend: (*) = Swimmers who participated in the heat only.

Water polo

Men's tournament

Team roster

Joel Dennerley
Richard Campbell
George Ford
Joe Kayes
Nathan Power
Lachlan Edwards
Aidan Roach
Aaron Younger (C)
Andrew Ford
Timothy Putt
Rhys Howden
Blake Edwards
Anthony Hrysanthos
Coach: Elvis Fatović

Group B

Playoffs

Quarterfinal

5th–8th place semifinals

Fifth place game

Women's tournament

Team roster

Gabriella Palm
Keesja Gofers
Hannah Buckling
Bronte Halligan
Iso Bishop
Bronwen Knox
Rowie Webster (C)
Amy Ridge
Zoe Arancini
Lena Mihailovic
Elle Armit
Madeleine Steere
Lea Yanitsas
Coach: Predrag Mihailović

Group D

Playoffs

Quarterfinals

Semifinals

Third place game

References

World Aquatics Championships
2019
Nations at the 2019 World Aquatics Championships